The 2021 French F4 Championship was the 11th season to run under the guise of the French F4 Championship and the fourth under the FIA Formula 4 regulations. The championship used Mygale M14-F4 chassis. The series began on 3 April at Circuit Paul Armagnac and ended on 24 October at Circuit de Nevers Magny-Cours.

Driver lineup

Race calendar

On 27 November 2020 French Federation of Automobile Sport announced a seven-round calendar with the round supporting provisionally 2021 French Grand Prix. On 20 January 2021, FFSA Academy announced another round at Magny-Cours in October instead as the idea was dropped. The round at Circuit de Lédenon was postponed from 27–29 August to 10–12 September due to the clash of FFSA GT Championship, the main event, with 2021 GT World Challenge Europe.

Championship standings

Each driver's lowest scoring meeting was omitted from their final point tally. To have points dropped from a round, the driver must have competed in all three races.

Points were awarded as follows:

Drivers' standings – FFSA Academy

Drivers' standings – FIA Formula 4

Juniors' standings

Notes

References

External links
Official website of the FFSA Academy

F4
French F4
French F4